Genghis Barbie is an American horn quartet founded in New York City. They perform works in the classical music genre as well as arrangements of folk tunes and pop music.

History 
The quartet was formed in 2010 by founding members Danielle Kuhlmann (Velvet Barbie), Jacquelyn Adams (Jungle Barbie), Rachel Drehmann (Attila the Horn), and Alana Vegter Gartrell (Freedom Barbie). The group's name was inspired by a family friend who at a young age drew a comic strip called "Genghis Barbie."

Members, as well as guest artists on their studio albums, take on a "Barbie name" as an alter ego and as part of the group's irrevent persona. Past members also include Leelanee Sterrett (Cosmic Barbie), Kelly Csillam Misko (Electric Barbie), and Wei Ping Chou (Sunshine Barbie).

The group has worked pedagogically as guest artists and lecturers with universities on women's studies panels and exploring entrepreneurship in music.

Genghis Barbie has performed extensively, predominately in the U.S., at annual symposiums of the International Horn Society and Carnegie Hall. In television, the group appeared in season 1 of The Chris Gethard Show and season 7 of America's Got Talent. Their recording of A-ha's "Take On Me" was used in season 3 of the HBO show The Leftovers.

Works written for the group 

 On the Hunt – Elizabeth A. Kelly (2012) – premiered with the New York Youth Symphony with conductor Ryan McAdams 
 The River – Kyrie McIntosh (2012) – recorded on the studio album Songs for Noa
 Song for a Nightingale – Rubin Kodheli (2013) – recorded on the studio album Songs for Noa
 Guns N' Rosenkavalier (rock-recital) – arr. John Glover, Andrew Wilkowske; lyrics by Kelley Rourke (2014)
 Common Backyard Dinosaurs – Brad Balliet (2019) – recorded on the studio album 2 Legit

Discography 

 Genghis Barbie – Genghis Vinyl Records (2011)
 Home for the Holidays – Sublyme Records (2011)
 Songs for Noa – Sublyme Records (2013)
 Amp it Up! – Genghis Vinyl Records (2013)
 2 Legit – Genghis Vinyl Records (2019)

References

External links 
 Genghis Barbie official website
 Genghis Barbie YouTube
 Genghis Barbie Bandcamp

Musical quartets